Yuri Buzzi (born 26 September 1978) is an Italian actor and writer.

Born in Vigevano, he debuted, in the 2005 in the Tv series Il giudice Mastrangelo.  Six years later, he decided against accepting an opportunity to work in theatre, choosing instead to study at The Actors Studio.

He subsequently worked with numerous directors such as Paul Feig in the movie Spy (2015 film) produced by 20th Century Fox; Jordan Scott, Peter Thwaites worldwide campaign for Martini & Rossi produced by Gorgeous (film), Angelo Longoni in the movie Tiberio Mitri - il campione e la miss, Luca Lucini (Oggi sposi), Alessandro D'Alatri advertising campaign for Telecom Italia.

In the 2011 he replaced George Clooney as a Worldwide Martini Ambassador for Martini & Rossi. As a model he had the opportunity to work with the International model David Gandy and the designer Christian Louboutin during the launch of the Martini & Rossi Worldwide campaign at the Design Museum in London.  In 2013, he won Best Actor at the Dino De Laurentiis Film Festival for is performance in the movie Bibliothèque

His first book "My life on a cactus" a collection of 32 poems and a monologue for theatre, was published in (2008) by Casa editrice Giuseppe Laterza & figli

Filmography
Il giudice Mastrangelo (2005)
Gio (film)|Gio (2008)]
Oggi sposi (2009)
Il campione e la miss (2011)
Bibliothèque (2013)
Spy (2014)

References

External links
IMDb https://www.imdb.com/name/nm2642694/?ref_=fn_al_nm_1

Official website www.yuribuzzi.com

Corriere della Sera http://milano.corriere.it/milano/notizie/cronaca/11_ottobre_29/nuovo-clooney-yuri-buzzi-vigevano-1901988033546.shtml

GQ https://web.archive.org/web/20140509044724/http://www.gqitalia.it/show/lifestyle/2011/11/ecco-il-fortunato-vincitore-del-kisser-casting-martini

Glam UK http://uk.glam.com/gandy-helps-launch-next-supermodel/

Awards and recognitions
Best actor
Dino De Laurentiis Film Festival

1978 births
Living people
Italian male film actors
Italian male television actors
Male actors from London